Tash Rabat is a well-preserved 15th-century stone caravanserai in At-Bashy District, Naryn Province, Kyrgyzstan, located at an altitude of .

Geography 
Tash Rabat is located somewhat east of the main north-south highway. To the south are Lake Chatyr-Kul and Torugart Pass. To the north is Koshoy Korgon, a ruined fortress of uncertain date. The area is a center for hiking and horse-trekking. The caretakers of Tash Rabat offer horseback riding and lodging in yurts that are built in the vicinity of the caravanserai from May till September and meals will be also served upon request.

Research 

There has been some debate about whether Tash Rabat was originally built as a caravanserai or a temple. As early as 1888, Russian doctor and traveler Nicolay Lvovich Zeland suggested that the site was originally a Nestorian or Buddhist monastery. 

Research undertaken at the end of the 1970s and beginning of the 1980s by the Institute of History of the Kyrgyz Academy of Sciences concluded that Tash Rabat was originally built as a Nestorian monastery in the 10th century, although no Christian artifacts were found during excavations. Later it was determined to be a Buddhist monastery as all inscriptions, artifacts and references were found to be Buddhist in nature. This was further supported by the fact that its inhabitants were Buddhist during the period of its construction.

Architecture

The structure consists of 31 rooms, including chambers in the central hall. The rooms are square and topped with domes which have openings for light at the top; transition from a quadrangular frame to a dome is done using a squinch. Tash Rabat is completely made of rubble stone on clay mortar with gypsum mortar sealing joints. One of the furthest rooms also has a deep hole in the floor that reminds a well.

References

External links
Photos of Tash Rabat

Archaeological sites in Kyrgyzstan
Caravanserais
Hotels in Kyrgyzstan